MS Nordic Orion is a Danish bulk carrier registered in Panama City. It was built in 2011 by Oshima Shipbuilding. Nordic Orion has an ice-strengthened hull, and it is notable for being the first large sea freighter to transit the Arctic Northwest Passage.
It is owned and operated by Nordic Bulk Carriers.

Voyage through the Northwest Passage 
Nordic Orion started its voyage from the Port Metro Vancouver, Canada on 6 September 2013 carrying a cargo of 73,500 tons of coking coal. The ship completed its voyage through the passage on 27 September stopping at Nuuk, Greenland and reached its destination, the Port of Pori, Finland on 9 October 2013.

Northwest Passage shortened the distance between Vancouver and Pori by 1,000 nautical miles compared to the traditional route via the Panama Canal. Fuel savings were approximately $80,000.  Nordic Orion was also able to load 15,000 tons more cargo than sailing through the Panama Canal due to its depth limits.

The journey has been described as an opening of a new era on the commercial use of Arctic.
It has also caused criticism from environmental organisations such as the Bellona Foundation and some Canadian experts.

Nordic Bulk Carriers has acknowledged the Nordic Orion never would have made the voyage if the Canadian Coast Guard had not provided free icebreaker escorts.

References 

Bulk carriers
Ships built by Oshima Shipbuilding
Merchant ships of Denmark
2010 ships